This is a list of 363 species in the genus Bagous.

Bagous species

References

Bagous